Bilawal Iqbal (born 17 August 1989) is a Pakistani cricketer who plays for Central Punjab. In January 2021, he was named in Central Punjab's squad for the 2020–21 Pakistan Cup.

References

External links
 

1989 births
Living people
Pakistani cricketers
Lahore cricketers
People from Jhelum
Central Punjab cricketers